State Route 446 (SR 446) is a  state highway serving Washoe County, Nevada. The route runs from SR 445 (Pyramid Lake Highway) to SR 447 (Gerlach Road) at the town of Nixon.

History
SR 446 became a Nevada Scenic Byway on June 27, 1996, and was designated part of the Pyramid Lake National Scenic Byway on July 15 of that year.

Major intersections

See also

References

446
446
Transportation in Washoe County, Nevada